Alfred Percival Sharland (24 October 1890 – 18 July 1944) was an English first-class cricketer and civil servant.

Sharland was born at Croydon. He joined HM Customs and Excise as a customs officer in 1912. He later represented the Civil Service cricket team in its only appearance in first-class cricket against the touring New Zealanders at Chiswick in 1927. Batting twice during the match, he scored 2 runs in the Civil Service first-innings before being dismissed by Matt Henderson, while in their second-innings he was dismissed without scoring by the same bowler. He took one wicket in the New Zealanders first-innings, dismissing Stewie Dempster to finish with figures of 1 for 67. 

He died at Locksbottom, Kent in July 1944.

References

External links

1890 births
1944 deaths
People from Croydon
English civil servants
English cricketers
Civil Service cricketers